The 1974 Philadelphia Eagles season was the franchise's 42nd season in the National Football League. The team improved upon their previous season's record of 5–8–1, winning seven games. Despite the improvement, the team failed to qualify for the playoffs for the fourteenth consecutive season.

After having worn white helmets for the previous four seasons, the Eagles switched back to green helmets in 1974. The team has worn green helmets since.

Offseason

Draft

Roster

Schedule 

Note: Intra-division opponents are in bold text.

Week 13

Standings

References 

Philadelphia Eagles seasons
Philadelphia Eagles
Philadelphia Eagles